Ciano is a surname of Italian origin. People with that name include:

 Camillo Ciano (1990), Italian professional footballer
 Galeazzo Ciano (1903–1944), Italian foreign minister, and son-in-law of Mussolini
 Costanzo Ciano (1876–1939), Italian naval commander and politician, father of Galeazzo

See also

 Ciano (disambiguation)

Surnames of Italian origin